James Anderson (25 July 1913 – January 1993) was an English professional football left back who played in the Scottish League for Queen of the South, whom he also served as trainer after his retirement as a player. He also played for Wigan Athletic, playing 10 games for the club in the Cheshire League.

Career statistics

References 

1913 births
1993 deaths
English footballers
Association football fullbacks
Blyth Spartans A.F.C. players
Darlington F.C. players
Wigan Athletic F.C. players
Queen of the South F.C. players
Brentford F.C. players
Carlisle United F.C. players
English Football League players
Scottish Football League players
Queen of the South F.C. wartime guest players
Hamilton Academical F.C. wartime guest players
Footballers from Gateshead